Li Tiejun (1904 – 9 June 2002) was a Kuomintang general from Mei County, Guangdong. He served as commanding officer (CO) of the 3rd and 29th army groups as well as CO of other smaller units during the war.

After the Chinese Civil War in 1949, he moved to Taiwan where he became an official in the Ministry of National Defense. He later moved to the United States.

References
Hsu Long-hsuen, and Chang Ming-kai. History of the Sino Japanese War (1937-1945). 2nd ed. Taipei, Taiwan, Republic of China: Chung Wu Publishing Co., 1972.

National Revolutionary Army generals from Guangdong
American people of Chinese descent
Hakka generals
1904 births
2002 deaths
People from Meixian District
Republic of China politicians from Guangdong
Chinese Civil War refugees
Taiwanese people from Guangdong
Politicians from Meizhou